Paccha (Hispanicized spelling of the Kichwa word pakcha meaning "waterfall") is a town and parish in Cuenca Canton, Azuay Province, Ecuador. The parish covers an area of 25.6 km2 and according to the 2001 Ecuadorian census it had a population total of 5,311.

Origins
Founded "Parish Saint Francis of Paccha", on May 12, 1582, is one of the oldest parishes that make the City of Cuenca. Conformed by 20 villages (caserios) the parish is located 10 km from the center of the city of Cuenca.  Some villages are relative close to the center of the city, Little Monay Village being the closest about 4 km away from the center of the city.

The name and meaning of Paccha could be interpreted and sourced in two ways both originating from the Pre-Colonial period or even before the invasion and conquering by the Inca Empire. One possible meaning lies in the fact that in the native language of the region, including the Inca Empire the Quechua meaning for Paccha (Pachamama) is our Mother Earth. Although for the Inca's  the Pachamama was also a Goddess similar to the goddess Demeter in the Greek Mythology. Another possible historical meaning lies in the fact that Paccha was also the name of the Princess Paccha a princess from the northern lands, who married the Inca Emperor Huayna Capac in order to stop the conflict in this case the invasion of the Inca empire. Once the Inca's had conquered the land that now makes Ecuador, they fostered the last Inca Emperor Atahualpa.

Cultural History  

While there is no official records, nor any kind of research on the cultural value of Paccha. Actually this Parish holds a lot of history and many historical sites including ancient ruins and vocal folklore in form of legends that hardly survived the pass of time. Also Paccha is one of the few Parishes of the City of Cuenca that traditionally makes the Panama Hats know locally as "Sombrero de Paja Toquilla"(straw hats) plus many other traditional goods. 
The actual historical development of this Parish is unfortunately lost to the past of time, the little know history exist only as tales of the past told by the older generations. Yet the existence of certain objects, edification, places and local vocal folklore tells the abundant history of this Parish. Among the most prominent are the following.

Central Church
Named "Sanctuary of our lady of Sorrow" the Parish of Paccha by tradition is catholic like most of the City of Cuenca and Ecuador. Because of this factor history, tradition, religion and development go hand by hand. One can say the history of Paccha has been molded by religious traditions. The central church is one fine example of that; while the building itself is not that old, around 50 years old. the Real value and beauty lies inside: is Altar is a Masterpiece of fine wood carving, made using traditional methods found only in traditional Colonial styled Church's. Originally the Altar was a different color of what is now back then showcasing a variety of different colors among then different shades of green, purple, red, and few others but "Natural Aged Wood" color being the most prominent. Around 1998 the head priest at the time "Father Pedro Soto" noticed the lack of care and deteriorated state of the Altar and urgently started the work to repair the beautiful Altar. In the end the color was changed to a Gold Inca color and a section was added to the top of the altar. The decision to change the color to Gold was to match with the Altar of the Central Cathedral of Cuenca. An interesting fact is that the Saint Patrons of Paccha are "Saint Francis of Assisi" and "Our lady of the Holy Rosary" yet Our lady of Sorrow is the most venerated Saint which includes a pilgrimage on the Holy Week starting with Palm Sunday and ending on Eastern Day.

Village Chapel
Since the Parish of Paccha is made out of 20 small villages, each village have their own chapel each one featuring different architecture. Also each Village has its own patron saint.

References 

Populated places in Azuay Province
Parishes of Ecuador